Piedmontese Union (Union Piemontèisa, UP) was a regionalist political party active in Piedmont.

It was founded in 1981 by Roberto Gremmo, a former member of the Italian Communist Party. The party was soon joined by Gipo Farassino, another former Communist and well-known folk-singer. In the 1985 regional election UP won 1.1% of the vote under the banner of Liga Veneta.

In the 1987 general election Gremmo formed an alliance with Umberto Bossi's Lega Lombarda, but was damaged by the split led by Farassino, Mario Borghezio and Renzo Rabellino, who formed Autonomist Piedmont (PA).

In 1989 Bossi welcomed both UP and PA into his Lega Lombarda – Alleanza Nord coalition for the European Parliament election. Gremmo refused to join forces again with Farassino and Borghezio, who were separatists while he was a federalist, and resigned from editor of Lombardia Autonomista, the official publication of Lega Lombarda. Subsequently, he refused to participate to the founding process of Lega Nord and UP started its decline.

In the 1990 regional election, UP won 2.3% of the vote and Gremmo was elected to the Regional Council, while PA gained 5.1% and three regional councillors. For the 1992 general election, Gremmo transformed the party into Lega Alpina Piemont (LAP), sister-party of the Lega Alpina Lumbarda: PA, now part of Lega Nord, won 16.3% in Piedmont, LAP just 2.2%. The party has since then disappeared. Among its successors one can count Lega Padana Piemont of Rabellino.

Leadership
National Secretary: Roberto Gremmo (1981–1992)

References

Sources
History of Piedmontese autonomism

Political parties in Piedmont
Political parties established in 1981
Regionalist parties in Italy